Rayapudi is a neighbourhood and a part of Urban Notified Area of Amaravati, the state capital of the Indian state of Andhra Pradesh. It was a village in Thullur mandal of in Guntur district, prior to its denotification as gram panchayat.

Transport 
Rayapudi is located on the Vijayawada-Amaravati road. APSRTC operates buses on this route from Pandit Nehru bus station of Vijayawada.

Hotels 
SMAR Guest Rooms, a dormitory/hostel available for daily Rental basis, for Business travel, Office onsite visit, near High Court of Andhra Pradesh. Hotels available for Food (Breakfast, Lunch and Dinner).  For more details visit SMAR Guest Rooms

References 

Neighbourhoods in Amaravati